D. Kent Morest, M.D., born October 4, 1934 in Kansas City, MO; died December 30, 2020 in Cambridge, MA was an American educator and researcher. He is regarded as "the father of modern neuroanatomy of the auditory system.". His unconventional use of Golgi methods to study the neuroanatomy of the auditory nervous system in humans and mammals laid the foundation for investigations into central auditory signal processing. Other notable research interests included developmental neurobiology, and the processes related to hearing loss induced by exposure to loud noises.

Education 
Morest graduated with honors from the University of Chicago in 1955. As a medical school student, he was a fellow at the Montreal Neurological Institute, a Brown Student Fellow at Yale, and a Foreign Fellow of Yale at University College London. He received his M.D. with honors from Yale University in 1960.

Professional career 

Morest is best known for his usage of the Golgi Method and detail-oriented microscopy work throughout his research career, which led to the uncovering of important advances in understanding neural structure and function. Rather than using the traditional method of presenting the cells treated with Golgi techniques as opaque blobs on a neutral background, he took the unconventional step of including illustrations of the textures, dimensions, and surfaces of the cells in his studies, which he believed allowed for a richer understanding of the microscopist’s experience. He spearheaded the advancement of neuroscience (particularly auditory neuroscience) at the University of Connecticut Health Center (UCHC). He also founded the High Tech Center at UCHC. Dr. Morest was vital to the creation of the neuroscience doctoral program as well as the Department of Neuroscience at the University of Connecticut.

Timeline 

 1955 A.B. University of Chicago
 1960 M.D. Yale University
 1960-1963 Senior Assistant Surgeon, Neuroanatomical Sciences, NIH
 1963-1965 Assistant Professor of Anatomy, University of Chicago
 1965-1977 Assistant, Associate Professor, Anatomy Department, Harvard Medical School
 1977-2000 Professor of Anatomy, University of Connecticut
 2000-2012 Professor of Neuroscience, University of Connecticut (retirement)

Awards 

 The Charles Judson Herrick Award for Meritorious Contributions to Comparative Neurology, 1966, American Association of Anatomists.
 Charles N. Loeser Award for Excellence in Teaching in the Basic Medical Sciences, The University of Connecticut Health Center, 1981.
 Jacob Javits Neuroscience Investigator Award, 1984, NINDS, NIH.
 Claude Pepper Award, 1990, NIDCD, NIH.
 Professional Achievement Award, 2009, University of Chicago Alumni, University of Chicago.

Personal life 
In 1963, Morest married lab technician Rosemary Richtmyer. They had two children, Lydia and Claude.

Publications 
Morest has authored, co-authored and edited a number of books and articles.

Selected Papers

Books

References

External links 

 Publications from 1960-2003

Living people

1934 births